The Crowley's Ridge State Park Comfort Station is a historic visitor facility at Crowley's Ridge State Park, in Greene County, Arkansas.  Located in the campground section of the park, it is a single-story log structure with a gable roof, in which are latrine facilities.  It was built  by a crew of the Civilian Conservation Corps, and is a well-preserved example of the Rustic style architecture the CCC popularized.

The building was listed on the National Register of Historic Places in 1992.

See also
National Register of Historic Places listings in Greene County, Arkansas

References

Buildings and structures in Greene County, Arkansas
Crowley's Ridge
Government buildings completed in 1935
Park buildings and structures on the National Register of Historic Places in Arkansas
National Register of Historic Places in Greene County, Arkansas
1935 establishments in Arkansas
Civilian Conservation Corps in Arkansas
Rustic architecture in Arkansas